Inside This Machine is the second studio album from My Passion. The album was recorded in April 2010 at Outhouse Studios in Reading, England and was released on 18 April 2011. The band released the track "Seven Birds" as a free download from their website in July 2010.

"Asleep in the Asylum" was the first single, released on 2 November 2010. There was a limited CD single released which featured downloadable track "Seven Birds", which also featured on the album, and an exclusive new track titled "Dream in Colour".

On 23 February 2011, the release date for the album was announced in Kerrang! and on the band's Facebook site. The album was made available for pre-order on iTunes on 14 March 2011, along with a bonus track and downloadable album artwork. The album was released on 18 April 2011, with the second single from the album, "The Mess We Made Of Our Lives" being released the week beforehand.

At the start of July, My Passion released a third single from the album entitled "The Girl Who Lost Her Smile". The video to which was recorded live at the Electric Ballroom in Camden a month before release, whilst supporting Framing Hanley on tour.

Track listing

Personnel
 Laurence René - Vocals, Guitar
 John Be - Guitar
 Simon Rowlands - Bass
 Jonathan Gaskin - Guitar, Vocals, Electronics/Synth,
 Jamie Nicholls - Drums

References

External links
MySpace page

2011 albums
My Passion albums